Brothers Grimm Prize may refer to:

 Brothers Grimm Prize of the City of Hanau
 Brothers Grimm Prize of the University of Marburg
 , won in 1982 by author Paul Maar
 , won in 2003 by Peter Hunt (literary critic)